Nindangou is a town in the Bogandé Department of Gnagna Province in eastern Burkina Faso. The town has a population of 2,415.

References

External links
Satellite map at Maplandia.com

Populated places in the Est Region (Burkina Faso)
Gnagna Province